Óscar Martín Arce Paniagua (born 10 March 1967) is a Mexican politician from the National Action Party. From 2009 to 2012 he served as Deputy of the LXI Legislature of the Mexican Congress representing Baja California.

References

1967 births
Living people
Politicians from Tijuana
Members of the Chamber of Deputies (Mexico)
Presidents of the Chamber of Deputies (Mexico)
National Action Party (Mexico) politicians
21st-century Mexican politicians
Autonomous University of Baja California alumni
Universidad Iberoamericana alumni